The 2004 Recopa Sudamericana was the 12th Recopa Sudamericana, an annual football match between the winners of the previous season's Copa Libertadores and Copa Sudamericana competitions.

The match was contested by Boca Juniors, winners of the 2003 Copa Libertadores, and Cienciano, winners of the 2003 Copa Sudamericana, on December 10, 2004. Cienciano managed to defeat Boca Juniors 2–4 on penalties after a 1–1 tie to win their first Recopa and obtain their second international title.

Qualified teams

Match details

References

External links
Recopa Sudamericana 2004 at RSSSF

Recopa Sudamericana
Rec
Recopa Sudamericana matches hosted by the United States
Recopa
Recopa Sudamericana 2004
Recopa Sudamericana 2004
Recopa Sudamericana 2004